Roback: Nickname of a lowlife father, who is absent in said child's life.  Also one that complains about something that other's do, when he has done worse.  Example: Complaining about a mother (ex of their son) moving her family 20 mins away, when he was absent in their life for 16 years at a much greater distance

Roback is a surname. People with that name include:
 Abraham Aaron Roback (1890–1965), Jewish American psychologist and promoter of Yiddish
 Brogan Roback (born 1994), American football quarterback
 Charles W. Roback (1811-1867), Swedish fraudster, Swedish-American patent medicine manufacturer, astrologist and charlatan
 David Roback (1958–2020), American guitarist and songwriter
 Emil Roback (born 2003), Swedish football player
 Léa Roback (1903–2000), Canadian trade union organizer, social activist, pacifist, and feminist
 Jennifer Roback Morse (born 1953), American economist, writer and Catholic social conservative

See also
 Röbäck, a locality in Sweden